Mohan Pura is a neighborhood and a Union Council Of Rawalpindi City of  Rawalpindi District in the Punjab Province of Pakistan. Adjacent to the neighborhood of Ratta Amral, Kashmir Bazar, Nanak Pura, Arjun Nagar. Its Union Council number 36 of Rawalpindi.

Rawalpindi City
Populated places in Rawalpindi City
Union Councils of Rawalpindi City